Alvin Leon Matthews (born November 7, 1947) is a former professional American football safety who played in eight National Football League seasons from 1970–1977 for the Green Bay Packers, the Seattle Seahawks and the San Francisco 49ers.

External links
NFL.com player page

1947 births
Living people
American football defensive backs
Green Bay Packers players
Players of American football from Austin, Texas
San Francisco 49ers players
Seattle Seahawks players
Texas A&M–Kingsville Javelinas football players